The trillers are a group of passerine birds belonging to the cuckooshrike family Campephagidae partially making up the genus  Lalage. Their name come from the loud trilling calls of the males. There are about 12 species that usually exist in southern Asia and Australasia with a number of species in Pacific islands. They feed mainly on insects and fruit. They build a neat cup-shaped nest high in trees.

Trillers are fairly small birds, about 15 to 20 cm long. They are mainly black, grey and white in colour.

Most species are fairly common but the Samoan triller is considered to be endangered and the Norfolk Island subspecies of the long-tailed triller has gone extinct.

Taxonomy and systematics

Extant species
 Black-and-white triller, Lalage melanoleuca
 Pied triller, Lalage nigra
 White-rumped triller, Lalage leucopygialis
 White-shouldered triller, Lalage sueurii
 White-winged triller, Lalage tricolor
 Rufous-bellied triller, Lalage aurea
 White-browed triller, Lalage moesta
 Black-browed triller, Lalage atrovirens
 Varied triller, Lalage leucomela
 Mussau triller, Lalage conjuncta
 Polynesian triller, Lalage maculosa
 Samoan triller, Lalage sharpei
 Long-tailed triller, Lalage leucopyga
 Norfolk triller, Lalage leucopyga leucopyga

References

Perrins, Christopher, ed. (2004) The New Encyclopedia of Birds, Oxford University Press, Oxford.

 
Bird common names